Albert Sánchez Piñol (born 11 July 1965) is a Spanish anthropologist, non-fiction writer and novelist writing in Catalan and Spanish.

He has been described as a "significant European writer".

Works 

 Compagnie difficili (2000), with Marcelo Fois
 Pallassos i monstres (2000)
 Les edats d´or (2001)
 La pell freda (Cold Skin) (2002)
 Pandora al Congo (Pandora in the Congo) (2005)
 Tretze tristos tràngols (Trece tristes trances in Spanish) (2008)
 Victus (2012)
 Vae Victus (2015)
 Fungus, el rei dels Pirineus (2018)

See also

 List of anthropologists
 List of Catalan-language writers
 List of novelists
 List of Spanish writers

References

External links
 
 
 

1965 births

Living people
Date of birth missing (living people)
20th-century anthropologists
20th-century Spanish novelists

21st-century novelists
21st-century scholars